Holåtindan is a mountain in Skjåk Municipality in Innlandet county, Norway. The mountain is surrounded by several other notable mountains including Gjelhøi to the northeast, Hestbrepiggene to the east, Vesldalstinden to the southeast, and Tundradalskyrkja to the northwest. The Holåbreen glacier lies between this mountain and the nearby Gjelhøi.

See also
List of mountains of Norway

References

Skjåk
Mountains of Innlandet